The Rotunda was a building that stood in City Hall Park in Lower Manhattan, New York City, from 1818 to 1870.

History 
The Rotunda was built at the initiative of American artist John Vanderlyn to display panoramic paintings.  According to historians Edwin G. Burrows and Mike Wallace, Vanderlyn was motivated by the refusal of the city's cultural elite to include paintings such as his nude Ariadne Asleep on the Island of Naxos in public exhibitions on the grounds that it was an affront to public decency.  Backed by John Jacob Astor and other wealthy New Yorkers, he built The Rotunda. Widely regarded as the city's first art museum, it operated on a commercial footing.

The building was designed on the model of The Pantheon in Rome.

The Rotunda opened in 1818 to display Vanderlyn's Panoramic View of the Palace and Gardens of Versailles, a cyclorama now on display in a purpose-built, circular room in the American Wing of the Metropolitan Museum of Art, in New York City.  In the painting, to the right of the Latona Fountain, Vanderlyn painted himself pointing towards Czar Alexander I of Russia and King Frederick William III of Prussia.

In time its use changed to housing government agencies, and the building was altered accordingly. On November 5, 1852, in the offices of the Croton Aqueduct Department, the American Society of Civil Engineers and Architects was founded. The society held meetings at this location from 1853 to 1855.

Today, a bronze plaque inside the park marks the site of the Rotunda.

References

Further reading

Federal architecture in New York City
Demolished buildings and structures in Manhattan
Civic Center, Manhattan
1817 establishments in New York (state)
1870 disestablishments in New York (state)
Art museums established in 1818
Buildings and structures demolished in 1870